Agnee may refer to:

 Agnee (band), Indian rock band based in Pune
 Agnee (1988 film), 1988 Hindi language Indian feature film
 Agnee (2014 film), 2014 Bengali language women-centric action thriller film 
 Agnee 2, 2015 Bangladeshi action film
 Agnee (album)